"Chicken Noodle Soup" is a song by American recording artists from Webstar and Young B (an unsigned artist from Harlem born Bianca Dupree).  The song was released on September 12, 2006 as the lead single promoting Webstar's 2006 debut album Caught in the Web. The song was produced by music producer Da Drizzle, born Jamal Christopher Reynolds, who was Dupree's uncle, and also featured rapper [AG] The Voice of Harlem. The viral dance accompanying the song, was allegedly choreographed by Allie Bernard. 

In September 2019, South Korean rapper J-Hope of boy band BTS released a remake of the song featuring American singer Becky G.

Background 
The song is characterized by a bass/club beat accompanied by an air raid siren, and Young B's vocals on most of the song.

The remix features rapper Trina with Webstar, Young B, and Voice of Harlem as well as Rihanna.

Accompanying dance 
"Chicken Noodle Soup" also has an accompanying viral dance. Originating in Harlem, the dance became viral during 2006 on YouTube.

The basic dance features exaggerated shuffling, which consists of arm swinging, and a pantomime of the song's lyrics. See Litefeet for more.

Charts

References 

2006 debut singles
2006 songs
DJ Webstar songs
Hip hop dance